Krishna is a 2008 Indian Telugu-language action comedy film starring Ravi Teja and Trisha. The film is directed by V. V. Vinayak, cinematography by Chota K. Naidu and produced by B. Kasi Viswanatham. The film released on 11 January 2008, during the Sankranthi festival. The film was blockbuster at the box office and second highest-grossing Telugu film of 2008 after Jalsa. It was dubbed into Tamil as Madhura Thmiru. It was remade in Bengali as Awara, starring Jeet and Sayantika Banerjee and in Kannada as Rajani with Upendra and also in Bangladeshi Bangla as Prem Prem Paglaami (2013) starring Bappy Chowdhury and Achol. In 2013 movie was dubbed in Hindi under the title Krishna: The Power of Earth. It was dubbed in Bhojpuri as Krishna The Great. This film has brought some fame to the noted Tamil actor Kadhal Dhandapani in Telugu.

Plot
The film is about Krishna (Ravi Teja), who was once a software engineer but quits his job to give it to his friend and now is unemployed in Vijayawada. Sandhya (Trisha) is a girl from Hyderabad who studies in college and comes to Vijayawada for her vacation to stay with her elder brother Bobby (Brahmanandam) and his wife (Sana). Krishna falls in love with Sandhya at first sight and starts chasing her to win her heart and enters the upper portion of their house as tenants with his brother Chandra Shekar (Chandra Mohan) and sister-in-law (Sudha). In this process, Krishna has a clash with local rowdy Lanka Raju (Dhandapani). Mistaking him to be one Tapori, Sandhya hates him first but later on realizes his true nature. She returns to Hyderabad and lives with her older brother Shinde (Sayaji Shinde), a former builder and now a very powerful rowdy who is very possessive and protective about his sister. Krishna follows Sandhya to Hyderabad and works his way into their house with Bobby's help, and finally, both of them confess their love. There, Krishna knows Sandhya's flashback and how she is being chased by the notorious and cruel Jakka (Mukul Dev), assisted by his uncle (Jaya Prakash Reddy) for marriage. In the end, Krishna beats up Jakka, with Shinde killing the latter, and then Krishna marries Sandhya.

Cast

Production
This is the first movie that casts actor Ravi Teja with actress Trisha.  This has been a much-anticipated combination by many, including the hero Ravi Teja.
Ravi Teja's lack of enthusiasm in recent performances in Khatarnak and Dubai Seenu has spurred director V. V. Vinayak to tell the hero he must be more original, genuine, and enthusiastic about this present venture and Ravi Teja's close aid Shiva Rama Krishna was very much part of the movie coincidentally he is closest to the director as well. Meanwhile, Trisha is busy with two films simultaneously after the success of Aadavari Matalaku Ardhalu Verule. One of these films is Krishna and the other is Bujjigadu, starring Prabhas, filming mainly in her hometown and residence Chennai. Upon the release of the movie, the skin show of Trisha has been praised.

Filming
The filming crew filmed in Vijayawada for a couple of weeks, departing on 20 September.  There was a craze in Vijayawada to catch glimpses of filming. As per the request of Ravi Teja, who hails from Vijayawada, the crew also filmed a song there.

Soundtrack
The music was composed by Chakri and released by Aditya Music. All lyrics were penned by Chandrabose. The song "Adaragottu" was based on the song "Appadi Podu" from the 2004 movie Ghilli, starring Vijay and Trisha.

Box-office 
The film grossed 7.6 crores (56 million) in its opening week and grossed 13.88 crores in 2 weeks. By the end of its 4th week, it had grossed 18 crores. The film was blockbuster at the box office collecting 24 crores share worldwide and 2nd highest grosser of that year after Jalsa. The film completed its 50 days theatrical run in 164 theatres by March 2, 2008 and 100 days in 53 centres by April 21, 2008.

Television rights
The television tights of the film were sold to Zee Telugu. The satellite rights of the Hindi dubbed version were given to Colors Cineplex. The satellite rights of the Bhojpuri dubbed version went to Bhojpuri Cinema TV.

References

External links 
 

2008 films
Films directed by V. V. Vinayak
Telugu films remade in other languages
Indian romantic comedy films
Films shot in Vijayawada
Films set in Vijayawada
2000s Telugu-language films
Films scored by Chakri
2008 romantic comedy films
2000s action comedy-drama films
Indian action comedy-drama films
Films shot in Andhra Pradesh
Films set in Andhra Pradesh